The Fairchild SD-5 Osprey was an early high-speed reconnaissance drone developed by Fairchild Aircraft for the United States Army. Intended for use by the U.S. Army Signal Corps to target tactical ballistic missiles, it was cancelled before the first prototype could be completed, and did not see operational service.

Design and development
In 1960 the U.S. Army issued a requirement for the development of a high-speed, long-range reconnaissance drone to provide targeting information to the Army's tactical ballistic missile force; contracts for competing designs were awarded to Republic Aviation, which proposed an all-new design given the designation SD-4 Swallow, and Fairchild Aircraft, which developed a variant of the Bull Goose decoy missile as the SD-5 Osprey.

Given the full designation AN/USD-5 for its overall system, the SD-5 was of tailless delta configuration,   with power provided by a Pratt & Whitney J60 turbojet (the military version of the civilian JT12 engine); a single rocket booster of the jet-assisted takeoff type, giving  thrust for 3 seconds, allowed for zero length launch from a specially-designed trailer. Recovery following the mission was by parachute, with airbags used to cushion the landing; sensors including infrared scanners, side-looking airborne radar (SLAR) and optical mapping were available for use, and could be recovered following the mission, or transmitted during the mission via telemetry. Guidance during the mission was provided by an inertial navigation system and autopilot.

Operational history
The first flight of the SD-5 took place in May 1960; fifteen prototypes were constructed for the test program, with Fairchild quoting a cost per drone of $350,000-$400,000 USD for production aircraft. An operational date of 1964 was anticipated; however, due to the cost of the program, the SD-5 was cancelled in November 1962 before entering service.

Specifications

See also

References
Citations

Bibliography

External links
1961 National Archives newsreel on the Unmanned Airborne Surveillance System, AN/USD-5

SD-4
1950s United States military reconnaissance aircraft
Mid-wing aircraft
Single-engined jet aircraft
Tailless delta-wing aircraft
Unmanned military aircraft of the United States